Siri Ulvestad (born 30 September 1988) is a Norwegian orienteering competitor and cross-country skier. She is a two-time Junior World Orienteering Champion.

Junior career
Ulvestad competed at the 2007 Junior World Orienteering Championships in Dubbo, where she received a gold medal in the long distance and a gold medal in the relay event.

She participated at the 2007 Nordic Championships for juniors in Bornholm, where she received a gold medal in the sprint distance.

References

External links
 

1988 births
Living people
Sportspeople from Oslo
Norwegian orienteers
Female orienteers
Foot orienteers
20th-century Norwegian women
21st-century Norwegian women
Junior World Orienteering Championships medalists